Livelong is a hamlet  in the Rural Municipality of Mervin No. 499 in the Canadian province of Saskatchewan.

S0M 1J0 is a postal code for Livelong.

An annual celebration "Live it up day" is held in early August.  It is a one-day fun-filled fair. Breakfast, supper and dance, street entertainment, parade, food vendor booths and beer gardens. Horseshoes, baseball games, bingo, bowling, games of chance and children's games. 3rd annual $1000 hole-in-one play-off.

A war memorial cenotaph was erected in front of the Livelong Legion #192.  Constructed in 1988 in memory of all veterans of Livelong and district. The cenotaph was constructed by Bill Rhode, Sam Rhode, and Murray Kopp. Art Dorval made the cross and it was erected by Chief Denny.

Demographics 

Local businesses
Livelong is the home of :
Forest Edge Studios, featuring the Wildlife Art of Canadian Artist C.D.(Dave) Hiebert.
Trails End Buffalo Stix - Cranberry Craze are a meat and fruit snack.  Named by Food in Canada in 2005 as one of the top 10 entrepreneurs.
Sylvester Brothers Handcrafted Log Homes
Turtle River Campground / Cabins / Outfitting
TeaLife

Churches
St. John's Anglican Church

History
Livelong Legacies (Livelong, Deer Run, Dexter, Elmhurst, Freemont, Patch Grove, South Branch, Turtleview, Waskiagon, Turtle Lake, Thunderchild) published by the Saskatchewan Livelong Historical Society, 1981 971.242 LIV]

Organizations
Turtle Lake Watershed Inc. Their mission: The maintenance of a healthy aquatic ecosystem within the Turtle Lake watershed basin. (Turtle Lake is approx. 6 miles north of Livelong.)

Clubs
Livelong Pinetoppers
Livelong Curling Club

Notable residents
Charles J. Neale, awarded World War 1, Distinguished Conduct Medal. Resided in Livelong from 1950 - 1979.
Jeremy Power Regimbal, Director, spent his childhood in Livelong.
Lisa Guenther, Author,
Gordon Denny, Manager - Saskatchewan Fisheries Cooperative in Air Ronge, Saskatchewan, for whom Gordon Denny Community school is named after was a Livelong resident until the 1960s.
Blanchette, Marc - Tattoo artist at Turtleford, Saskatchewan

Pop culture
Girl at the Window: Author Byrna Barclay takes her readers from Livelong, Saskatchewan to Spain and the Island of Crete in this collection of short stories published in 2004.
The Garden of Eloice Loon, written by Edna Alford a Livelong resident.

References

External links
Trails End Buffalo Stix
Sylvester Brother's Handcrafted Log Homes
Cenotaph at Livelong Legion

Designated places in Saskatchewan
Mervin No. 499, Saskatchewan
Organized hamlets in Saskatchewan